National Indemnity Company is an insurance company based in Omaha, Nebraska, United States, and founded in 1940 by Jack Dabney Ringwalt. It is a subsidiary of Berkshire Hathaway, which bought the company in 1967. It is Berkshire's oldest operating subsidiary.

Between September 2019 and August 2020, Berkshire Hathaway purchased more than 5% of the outstanding stock of each of the five largest Japanese general trading companies, i.e. Itochu, Mitsubishi, Mitsui, Sumitomo, and Marubeni, through its subsidiary National Indemnity Company. These stakes were worth a total of over $6 billion as of August 2020.

References

External links
Official homepage

Financial services companies established in 1940
Insurance companies of the United States
Berkshire Hathaway
Companies based in Omaha, Nebraska

1940 establishments in the United States
1940 establishments in Nebraska
Financial services companies of the United States
Companies established in 1940